Telecommunication and Computer Industries Consortium (TCIC) Barnamenegar was established in 1995 in Tehran, Iran. TCIC first started with manufacturing personal computers (PCs), monitors, keyboards, mice, etc. This company was among the first three companies that brought the computer technology into Iran. 

TCIC then entered into the Telecom market and started manufacturing Pairgains (PCM) and different types of payphones such as: PSTN & GSM, Multimedia, and Indoor. In 2005, by selling more than 120,000 payphones, TCIC got 87% share of Iran's payphone market. In addition to the local market, this company has targeted the neighbor countries' markets.

External links
 Company's website

Computer companies of Iran